Rat Lake is a lake in Aitkin County, Minnesota, in the United States.

The Lake was so named for the local muskrat population.

See also
List of lakes in Minnesota

References

Lakes of Minnesota
Lakes of Aitkin County, Minnesota